The dollar was the currency of Penang between 1786 and 1826. It was subdivided into 100 cents, also called pice, and was equal to the Spanish dollar. The dollar was introduced after the East India Company acquired the island in 1786. In 1826, the Indian rupee was declared legal tender in Penang at a value of 48 pice. The dollar again became the currency of Penang with the introduction of the Straits dollar.

Large, tin 1 cent coins were issued between 1800 and 1809, followed by copper  and 1 cent in 1810. In 1826, copper , 1 and 2 cents coins were issued which were also minted in 1828, after the dollar had been replaced by the rupee.

References 

 

History of Penang
Modern obsolete currencies
Obsolete currencies in Malaysian history
British Malaya
1786 establishments in Asia
1826 disestablishments in Asia
British East India Company